Ibogamine is an anti-convulsant, anti-addictive, CNS stimulant alkaloid found in Tabernanthe iboga and Crepe Jasmine (Tabernaemontana divaricata). Basic research related to how addiction affects the brain has used this chemical.

Ibogamine persistently reduced the self-administration of cocaine and morphine in rats. The same study found that ibogamine (40 mg/kg) and coronaridine (40 mg/kg) did not produce "any tremor effects in rats that differ significantly from saline control".  While the related alkaloids ibogaine (20–40 mg/kg), harmaline (10–40 mg/kg) and desethylcoronaridine (10–40 mg/kg) were "obviously tremorgenic".

Chemistry

Synthesis 
Ibogamine can be prepared from one-step demethoxycarbonylation process through coronaridine.

Pharmacology 
Like ibogaine, it has seems to have similar pharmacology. It has effects on KOR, NMDAR, nAChR and serotonin sites. It also inhibits acetylcholinesterase and butyrylcholinesterase

See also 
 Coronaridine
 Ibogaine
 Ibogaline
 Tabernanthine
 Voacangine
 Harmaline

References 

Tryptamine alkaloids
Alkaloids found in Iboga
NMDA receptor antagonists
Oneirogens